Eduarda Damasia Mansilla Ortiz de Rozas de García (1834–1892) was a noted Argentine writer.

Biography
She was the daughter of Lucio Norberto Mansilla and niece of Juan Manuel de Rosas Her first novel under her own name was Pablo ou la via dans les pampas in 1869. As the title implies the novel was written in French. It concerned bringing order to the Pampas. The French language had esteem in Argentina and she had spent time in Paris. She also wrote of her visits to the United States where she sympathized with the Native Americans in the United States, while nevertheless emphasizing them as primitive, but also sympathized with the slave-owners of the Confederate States of America. In life she had to deal with men of conflicting political beliefs as her husband was the son of an opponent of Juan Manuel de Rosas.

Musical influence
Eduarda Mansilla was formally trained to be a musician. Growing up in Buenos Aires she had learned to play the piano. This particular aspect of her up bringing was a result of the prevalent social norms of the times, which dictated that people of high social standing be well versed in music. Mansilla even composed music, and had published some of them.

Her musical training manifested in her writings as well. Music as a subject, its performance, and references to musical instruments are common in her literary works.

See also
 Lists of writers

References

External links
 

Argentine women novelists
Argentine writers in French
1834 births
1892 deaths
19th-century novelists
19th-century Argentine women writers
Burials at La Recoleta Cemetery